Lasha Nozadze (born 18 March 1980) is a retired Georgian professional football player.

External links

Soccerway Profile

1980 births
Living people
Footballers from Georgia (country)
Georgia (country) international footballers
FC Dinamo Tbilisi players
FC Shakhter Karagandy players
Expatriate footballers from Georgia (country)
Expatriate footballers in Kazakhstan
Expatriate sportspeople from Georgia (country) in Kazakhstan
Association football midfielders